Events from the year 1990 in Sweden

Incumbents
 Monarch – Carl XVI Gustaf
 Prime Minister – Ingvar Carlsson

Events
 February 15 – After its demand for a vote of confidence, to fight the burgeoning economic crisis, is voted down by the Riksdag, Prime Minister Ingvar Carlsson tenders his cabinet's resignation to the Speaker, Thage G. Peterson. Because a Socialist majority still exist in the Riksdag, Carlsson returns as Prime Minister in charge of a new  and reconstituted Social Democratic Cabinet.

Popular culture

Film
5 February – The 25th Guldbagge Awards were presented

Literature
Arne Dahl – Chiosmassakern

Births

15 January – Emil Herge, footballer
10 March – Calle Lindh, alpine skier 
31 March
 Markus Olsson, handball player
 Sandra Roma, tennis player
25 May – Simon Gustafsson, speedway rider 
9 August – Bill Skarsgård, actor 
28 November – Anton Halén, handball player

Full date missing
Magdalena Olsson, orienteering and ski orienteering competitor.

Deaths

24 February – Aina Erlander, Swedish lecturer.
 8 September - Sven Rosendahl, journalist and novelist (born 1913).
 21 December – Magda Julin, figure skater, Olympic champion 1920 (born 1894).

References

 
Sweden
Years of the 20th century in Sweden